Nicholas Matthew(s) Condy, or Nicholas Condy the Younger, or Junior (1818 – 20 May 1851) was a British maritime painter.

Life

Birth and education
He was born on 12 May 1818 in Dover to Nicholas Condy (1793–1857) and Ann Trevanion Condy (née Pyle; 1792–1860), but baptised on 6 April 1824 in Plymouth, St Andrew.  His father was a painter of landscapes, and they are often confused with each other. He went to the Mount Radford School in Exeter and later studied under The Reverend C Thomas of Lew Trenchard. Intended for a career in the Army or Navy, he instead became a professional marine painter.

Artistic career
His work attracted the early admiration of the Earl of Egremont, J M W Turner’s patron. Three of his sea-pieces were exhibited at the Royal Academy from 1842 to 1845, which gave hopes of his becoming a distinguished artist.

Death
He lived in Plymouth until his sudden and premature death at the Grove, Plymouth, on 20 May 1851 when aged only thirty-two.  He left a widow, Flora Ross, the third daughter of Major John Lockhart Gallie, of the 28th Regiment and a daughter, Harriet Charlotte Florence Pigott Condy (1846–1880) who married the painter Walter Duncan (1848–1932). After his death Flora married her cousin Samuel Charles Roby.

Style and artistic achievement
Condy used a detailed knowledge of ships acquired in his home town to paint accurate ship portraits, and his native Devon countryside is featured in such paintings as Ships off Devonport and The Post Office Packet Shelldrake off Falmouth (both in the National Maritime Museum, London). He was a successful and established artist whose work is still sought after today.

References

Attribution

External links 
 

1816 births
1851 deaths
19th-century English painters
English male painters
British marine artists
Artists from Plymouth, Devon
People educated at Mount Radford School
19th-century English male artists